The Embassy of Iraq in Moscow is the diplomatic mission of Iraq to Russia. The chancery is located at 12 Pogodinskaya Street in the Khamovniki District of Moscow. The Head of Mission is Haidar Hadi, who was posted to Moscow in January 2017.

See also 
 Iraq–Russia relations
 Diplomatic missions in Russia

References 

Iraq–Russia relations
Iraq
Moscow
Khamovniki District
Iraq–Soviet Union relations